The MIPIM Architectural Review Future Projects Awards is an award program for unbuilt or incomplete projects spanning across eight categories. It is organised and awarded annually by the MIPIM (Le marché international des professionnels de l’immobilier), the international property market in Cannes, France, in cooperation with the monthly international magazine Architectural Review. Since 2002, the awards have been presented at MIPIM.

Winners

2018

OVERALL WINNER
Project: Shanghai Old Town Master Plan, Shanghai, China
Architect: Skidmore, Owings & Merrill

BIG URBAN PROJECTS
Project: The Hydroelectric Canal, Boston, Massachusetts, United States
Architect: Paul Lukez Architecture

CIVIC & COMMUNITY
Project: Skellefteå Cultural Centre, Skellefteå, Sweden
Architect: White Arkitekter

CULTURAL REGENERATION
Project: Istanbul Museum of Painting and Sculpture, Istanbul, Turkey
Architect: EAA-Emre Arolat Architecture

MIXED USE
Project: L'atelier de l'Arsenal, Paris, France
Architect: SO – IL + laisné roussel

OFFICES
Project: Cradle to Cradle S2, Düsseldorf, Germany
Architect: HPP Architekten

OLD & NEW
Project: 390 Madison Avenue, New York City, New York, United States
Architect: Kohn Pedersen Fox Associates

REGENERATION & MASTERPLANNING
Project: Shanghai Old Town Master Plan, Shanghai, China
Architect: Skidmore, Owings & Merrill

RESIDENTIAL
Project: Nibras Commercial Residential Complex, Al-Hail, Muscat, Oman
Architect: EAA-Emre Arolat Architecture

RETAIL & LEISURE
Project: Marchwiel, Tasmania, Australia
Architect: John Wardle Architects

SPORTS & STADIUMS
Project: Al Thumama Stadium, Al Thumama, Qatar
Architect: Arab Engineering Bureau

SUSTAINABILITY
Project: Parque Botánico Río Medellín, Medellin, Colombia
Architect: Latitud/Amigos de Parques del Rio

TALL BUILDINGS
Project: Commercial Bank Headquarters, Taichung, Taiwan
Architect: Aedas

2017

JEU D'ESPRIT PRIZE
Project: Media City, Istanbul, Turkey
Architect: Gökhan Avcıoğlu, GAD

INNOVATION
Project: Sino-Finnish Economic, Trade and Cultural Cooperation Centre, Nanjing, China
Architect: PES-Architects

CULTURAL REGENERATION
Project: Museum of Imperial Kiln, Jingdezhen City, Jiangxi Province, China
Architect: Studio Pei-Zhu

MIXED USE
Project: The Hills at Vallco, Cupertino, California, USA
Architect: Rafael Viñoly Architects

BIG URBAN PROJECTS
Project: Madinat Al Irfan, Muscat, Oman
Architect: Allies and Morrison

OFFICES
Project: 2050 M Street, Washington, DC, USA
Architect: REX Architecture

RESIDENTIAL
Project: 118 E 59th Street Residences, New York, USA
Architect: Tabanlıoğlu Architects

TALL BUILDINGS
Project: Ceylonz Suites, Kuala Lumpur, Malaysia
Architect: Tan'ck Architect / Tan Chee Khoon

REGENERATION & MASTERPLANNING
Project: Nya Hovås Urban Plan, Gothenburg, Sweden
Architect: Utopia Arkitekter

SPORTS & STADIUMS
Project: Power Court Stadium, Luton, UK
Architect: And Architects

RETAIL & LEISURE
Project: Liepāja Thermal Bath, Liepāja, Latvia
Architect: Steven Christensen Architecture

OLD & NEW
Project: Lambeth Palace Library and Archive, London, UK
Architect: Wright & Wright Architects

CIVIC & COMMUNITY
Project: Hüsame Köklü Women's Community and Production Centre, Bayburt, Turkey
Architect: Tabanlıoğlu Architects

2016

OVERALL WINNER 
Project: Astana railway station 
Architect: Tabanlıoğlu Architects

CULTURAL REGENERATION AWARD 
Project: The Three Cultural Centers and One Book Mall complex, Shenzhen, China 
Architect: Mecanoo Architects

SUSTAINABILITY PRIZE 
Project: Skyfarm 
Architect: Rogers Stirk Harbour + Partners

RETAIL AND LEISURE PRIZE 
Project: Spa Complex 
Architect: GPY Arquitectos

SPORTS AND STADIUMS 
Project:  UFCSPA Campus Igara, Porto Alegre, Brazil  
Architect: OSPA Arquitetura e Urbanismo

OLD AND NEW 
Project: Bispebjerg Hospital, Denmark 
Architect:CF Moller

RESIDENTIAL 
Project: Liaisons, China 
Architect: MOB Architects

MIXED-USE PRIZE 
Project: Reinvent Paris 
Architect: NBBJ

REGENERATION AND MASTERPLANNING 
Project: Dune City 
Architect: SAS Studio

JEU d'ESPRIT PRIZE 
Project: A Rare Office, Roro, Sweden 
Architect:

2014

OVERALL WINNER 
Project: Sky Courts, Mumbai, India 
Architect: Sanjay Puri Architects

BIG URBAN PROJECTS 
Project: Paojiang Lake, Shaoxing, China 
Architect: Paul Lukez Architecture with CRJA Landscape Architects and Green Design Union

CULTURAL REGENERATION 
Project: Place Lala Yeddouna, Fez, Morocco 
Architect: Mossessian & Partners with Yassir Khalil Studio

MIXED USE 
Project: Vanke Jiugong, Beijing, China 
Architect: Jan Closterman

OFFICES 
Project:  (FGS) Campus, Düsseldorf, Germany 
Architect: Eller + Eller Architekten

OLD & NEW 
Project: Transforming Social Houses into Sociable Homes, S. Polo, Bresica, Italy 
Architect: Luca Peralta Studio

REGENERATION & MASTERPLANNING 
Project: Eiland Veur Lent, Nijmegen, Netherlands 
Architect: Baca Architects

RESIDENTIAL 
Project: Sky Courts, Mumbai, India 
Architect: Sanjay Puri Architects

RETAIL & LEISURE 
Project: Sultangazi Market Hall & Car Park, Istanbul, Turkey 
Architect: Suyabatmaz Demirel Architects

SPORTS & STADIUMS 
Project: Alfriston Pool, Beaconsfield, United Kingdom 
Architect: Dugan Morris Architects

TALL BUILDINGS 
Project: One Wood Wharf, London, United Kingdom 
Architect: Herzog & de Meuron

SUSTAINABILITY AWARD 
Project: Next Generation Container Port, Singapore 
Architect: Osamu Morishita

2011
OVERALL WINNER 
Project: Musheireb - Heart of Doha, Qatar  
Architect: Mossessian & Partners

SUSTAINABILITY 
Project: Zero Carbon Emission Building, Shanghai, China 
Architect: Arup Associates

BIG URBAN PROJECTS 
Project: Sino Swedish Eco-City, Wuxi, China 
Architect: Tengbom Architects, Jeremy Thompson, Stellan Fryxell, Anna Kerr

MIXED USE 
Project: Musheireb - Heart of Doha, Qatar  
Architect: Mossessian & Partners

OFFICES 
Project: Inland Steel Building Renovation, Chicago, IL, USA 
Architect: Stephen Apking, Skidmore, Owings & Merrill

REGENERATION AND MASTERPLANNING 
Project: The Earls Court Project, Earls Court, London, UK 
Architect: Terry Farrell & Partners

RESIDENTIAL 
Project: Skyline Paris, France  
Architect: Pangalos Dugasse Feldmann Architectes

RETAIL AND LEISURE 
Project: New Siena Stadium, Siena, Italy 
Architect: Iotti + Pavarani Architetti, Marazzi Architetti with Arch. Giovanni Cenna

TALL BUILDINGS  
Project: Cluster Complex, Dubai, UAE 
Architect: Denton Corker Marshall

2009
OVERALL WINNER 
Project: 360° Building, São Paulo, Brazil 
Architect: Isay Weinfeld Arquitetura

BIG URBAN PROJECTS
Project: Magok Waterfront, Seoul, South Korea 
Architect: Samoo Architects & Engineers

MIXED USE 
Project: Holbaek Harbour Masterplan and DGI-byen Sports and Leisure Complex, Holbaek Municipality, Denmark 
Architect: schmidt hammer lassen

OFFICES
Project: Double Jew & Archipel, Lyons, France 
Architect: Odile Decq Benoit Cornette Architects

REGENERATION AND MASTERPLANNING 
Project: Valladolid Masterplan, Spain 
Architect: Rogers Stirk Harbour + Partners with Vidal y Asociados Arquitectos

RESIDENTIAL
Project: 360° Building São Paulo, Brazil 
Architect: Isay Weinfeld Arquitetura

RETAIL AND LEISURE 
Project: Timber Stadium, Anywhere 
Architect: de Rijke Marsh Morgan Architects

TALL BUILDINGS 
Project: Kempinski Hotel & Residences, Jeddah, Saudi Arabia 
Architect: Perkins+Will

SUSTAINABILITY
Project: 100,000 Euro House, Turin, Italy 
Architect: MCA Mario Cucinella Architects

Project: Arpa Offices, Ferrara, Italy 
Architect: MCA Mario Cucinella Architects

2008
OVERALL WINNER
Project: Al Hamra Firdous Tower, Kuwait City, Kuwait 
Firm/Practice: Gary Haney, Skidmore, Owings & Merrill, USA

SUSTAINABILITY
Project: Alamoot Eco-Village, Iran 

REGENERATION AND MASTERPLANNING 
Project: Alamoot Eco-Village, Iran
Firm/Practice: Somayeh Rokhgireh and Ali Pooladi, Sustainabled (Artelio Design Inc.),  Canada

RETAIL & LEISURE
Project: Hilton Development, Wroclaw, Poland
Firm/Practice: Gottesman Szmelcman Architecture with Broadway Malyan Polska, Warsaw

RESIDENTIAL
Project: Group Housing, Greater Noida, India
Firm/Practice: FXFOWLE/Sudhir Jambhekar, FXFOWLE International, USA

BIG URBAN PROJECTS
Project: Media and Cultural City, Tripoli, Libya 
Firm/Practice: Astudio, UK

OFFICES
Project: Amazon Court, Prague, Czech Republic
Firm/Practice: Schmidt Hammer Lassen, Denmark

TALL BUILDINGS
Project: Al Hamra Firdous Tower, Kuwait City, Kuwait
Firm/Practice: Gary Haney, Skidmore, Owings & Merrill, USA

MIXED USE
Project: St Boltoph's Cultural Quarter, Colchester, UK
Firm/Practice: Ash Sakula Architects, UK

2006
Overall winner 
Project: Doha Gardens, Al Khobar, Saudi Arabia
Architect: Nabil Gholam Architecture

MASTERPLANNED COMMUNITIES
Project: Doha Gardens, Al Khobar, Saudi Arabia 
Architect: Nabil Gholam Architecture

RETAIL & LEISURE 
Project: Zlote Tarasay, Warsaw, Poland
Architect: The Jerde Partnership

RESIDENTIAL
Project: Nordhavnen-Residences, Nordhavnen, Copenhagen, Denmark
Architect: 3XN

BIG URBAN PROJECTS
Project: Fulton Street Transit Center, New York, USA 
Architect: Grimshaw

OFFICES
Project: Savings Bank 'Middelfart', Algade 69, Middelfart, Denmark
Architect: 3XN

TALL BUILDINGS 
Project: The Met, South Sathorn Road, Bangkok, Thailand
Architect: WOHA Architects

LOCAL REVITALISATION 
Project: Revitalisation of the European Village, The New Garden Village
Architect: Arkitekturavaerkstedet/landskabsvaerkstedet

INNOVATION
Project: Bridging The Rift Research Facility, Wadi Araba, Israel /Jordan Border
Architect: Skidmore, Owings & Merrill

2005
BEST OF SHOW

Project:  Main Station, Stuttgart

Firm/Practice:  Ingenhoven und Partner Architekten

MASTERPLANNED COMMUNITIES

Winner

Project:  Luchao Harbour City, near Shanghai, China

Firm/Practice:  gmp – von Gerkan, Marg und Partner – Architects

Highly Commended

Project:  Stratford City Masterplan, London, UK

Firm/Practice:   Fletcher Priest Architects / Arup Associates / West 8

Mention

Project:  The Bridges, Calgary, Alberta, Canada

Firm/Practice:  Sturgess Architecture

RETAIL & LEISURE

Winner

Project:  Citroen Communication Center – Champs-Élysées, Paris, France

Firm/Practice:   Manuelle Gautrand

Highly Commended

Project:  Jebel Ali Lighthouse Marina, Dubai, United Arab Emirates

Firm/Practice:  Skidmore, Owings & Merrill LLP

Highly Commended

Project:  “Paralimnio” Recreational Center, Ioannina, Greece

Firm/Practice:  Lena Spania and Associates Architects

RESIDENTIAL

Winner

Project:   “The city for all ages” dwellings, care centers and kindergarten, Valby, DK

Firm/Practice:  3XN

Highly Commended

Project:  Man-cho Project, Man-cho, Izumi-City, Osaka, Japan

Firm/Practice:  Satoshi Seki Architectural Avant-Garde

Highly Commended

Project:  Public Housing Development, Duxton Plain, Singapore

Firm/Practice:  Woha Designs PTE Ltd

BIG URBAN PROJECTS

Winner

Project:   Main Station, Stuttgart

Firm/Practice:  Ingenhoven und Partner Architekten

Highly Commended

Project:  Freedom Park, Bangalore, India

Firm/Practice:  Mathew & Ghosh Architects

Highly Commended

Project:  Cranfield Mills, Ipswich, England

Firm/Practice:  John Lyall Architects, UK

OFFICES

Winner

Project:   ARB Bank, Riyadh, Saudi Arabia

Firm/Practice:  Skidmore, Owings & Merrill LLP, USA

Highly Commended

Project:  The Minerva Building

Firm/Practice:  Grimshaw, UK

Highly Commended

Project:  Torre Agbar, Barcelona, Spain

Firm/Practice:  Layetana Desarrollos Immobiliarios, S.L., Spain

TALL BUILDINGS

Winner

Project:   The Dubai Tower

Firm/Practice:  Grimshaw, UK

INNOVATION AWARD FOR MATERIALS & TECHNOLOGY

Winner

Project:  Man-cho Project, Man-cho, Izumi-City, Osaka, Japan

Firm/Practice:  Satoshi Seki Architectural Avant-Garde

2003
In 2003 the category winners were: 
Overall winners:
Project: Swiss Re
Architect: Foster + Partners

Project:: Sydney Harbour Moving Image Centre
Architect: Francis-Jones Morehen Thorp

See also
List of architecture prizes

References

Architecture awards